Tethys is a genus of sea slugs, nudibranchs, marine gastropod mollusks in the family Tethydidae.

Species
 Tethys dominguensis Pruvot-Fol, 1954
 Tethys fimbria Linnaeus, 1767
 Tethys occidentalis (Odhner, 1936)
Synonyms
 Tethys (Aplysia): synonym of Aplysia Linnaeus, 1767
 Tethys (Aplysia) morio Verrill, 1901: synonym of Aplysia morio (A. E. Verrill, 1901)
 Tethys capensis O'Donoghue, 1929: synonym of Aplysia juliana Quoy & Gaimard, 1832
 Tethys cornigera Macri, 1816: synonym of Tethys fimbria Linnaeus, 1767 
 Tethys extraordinaria Allan, 1932: synonym of Aplysia extraordinaria (Allan, 1932) (original combination)
 Tethys fimbriata: synonym of Tethys fimbria Linnaeus, 1767 (misspelling)
 Tethys floridensis Pilsbry, 1895: synonym of Aplysia fasciata Poiret, 1789
 Tethys hirasei Baba, 1936: synonym of Aplysia oculifera A. Adams & Reeve, 1850
 Tethys leporina Linnaeus, 1758: synonym of Tethys fimbria Linnaeus, 1767 (ICZN opinion 200: suppressed under the plenary powers for the purposes of the principle of Priority only)
 Tethys panamensis Pilsbry, 1895: synonym of Aplysia dactylomela Rang, 1828
 Tethys parthenopeia Macri, 1816: synonym of Tethys fimbria Linnaeus, 1767
 Tethys peasei Tryon, 1895: synonym of Aplysia peasei (Tryon, 1895)
 Tethys pilsbryi Letson, 1898 accepted as Aplysia pilsbryi (Letson, 1898)
 Tethys polyphylla Macri, 1816: synonym of Tethys fimbria Linnaeus, 1767
 Tethys pulmonica (Gould, 1852): synonym of Aplysia pulmonica Gould, 1852
 Tethys robertsi Pilsbry, 1895: synonym of Aplysia robertsi (Pilsbry, 1895)
 Tethys willcoxi (Heilprin, 1887): synonym of Aplysia fasciata Poiret, 1789

References

  Linnaeus C. (1767). Caroli Linnaei...Systema naturae per regna tria naturae: secundum classes, ordines, genera, species, cum characteribus, differentiis, synonymis, locis. Editio duodecima. 1. Regnum Animale. 1 & 2 Holmiae, Laurentii Salvii. Holmiae [Stockholm], Laurentii Salvii. pp. 1–532 
 Gofas, S.; Le Renard, J.; Bouchet, P. (2001). Mollusca. in: Costello, M.J. et al. (eds), European Register of Marine Species: a check-list of the marine species in Europe and a bibliography of guides to their identification. Patrimoines Naturels. 50: 180-213

External links
   ICZN 1954. Opinion 200. Validation, under the Plenary Powers, of the accumstomed usage of the generic names Tethys Linnaeus, 1767, and Aplysia Linnaeus, 1767 (Class Gastropoda). Opinions and declarations rendered by the International Commission on Zoological Nomenclature, 3: 241-265

Tethydidae